Lebanese singer Nancy Ajram has released twelve studio albums (including two dedicated for children), four live albums, one compilation album, two reissues and 51 singles. As of 2007, she has sold 30 million records worldwide, making her one of the best-selling Middle Eastern music artists. Numerous of Ajram's singles have reached number one on several Arabic music charts, including Hit Marker and The Official Lebanese Top 20. By 2010, Ajram was announced the best-selling Middle Eastern female singer of the decade (2000–2009).

At age 15, Ajram made her musical debut in 1998 when she signed a multi-album contract with EMI and released her debut album Mihtagalak the same year. According to her, the contract with EMI did not help her back then as the album received no attention on media, although the lead single "Mitagalak" peaked within the top ten of single charts in Lebanon. Like her debut record, Ajram's second studio album Sheel Oyoonak Anni (2001) produced only one single.

Ajram rose to fame with the start of her collaboration with well-known Lebanese producer Jiji Lamara and third studio album Ya Salam. The album's lead single "Akhasmak Ah", became a massive commercial success, topping Arabic music charts for 10 continuous weeks. Two further singles were released from the album, "Ya Salam" and "Yay" which managed chart success in several Arab countries.

The singer's fourth album, Ah W Noss was released in April 2004 and debuted atop the Arabic sales charts. The album's eponymous lead single "Ah W Noss" reached number one on all Arabic music charts including Lebanon and Egypt, becoming one of Ajram's internationally most successful hits of all time. It was followed by further three singles, including "Oul Tani Keda", which served as her Coca-Cola campaign first hit. Ajram's fifth studio album, Ya Tabtab...Wa Dallaa (2006), spawned six singles including the commercial success "Ehsas Jdeed", which topped the Arabic charts for a couple of weeks. In June 2007, Ajram released her first children's album entitled Shakhbat Shakhabit with a seven-minute medley music video. It was the most notable and successful work for children at the time.

Ajram's sixth studio album Betfakkar Fi Eih was released on July 30, 2008, after an accompanying music video that premiered on Melody Hits. Betfakkar Fi Eih broke the record in Hit Marker's Top 10 best-selling Arabic album charts by remaining for 54 consecutive weeks in the list. The Album produced seven singles, including two promotional, which continued Ajram's reign as the artist with most number-one hits in the history of the modern Arab music industry. With Betfakkar Fi Eih, Ajram won her first World Music Award as the World's best selling Middle Eastern artist, becoming the youngest Arabian act to date to score a WMA.

In September 2010, Ajram released her seventh studio album Nancy 7, featuring four successful singles. The lead single, "Fi Hagat" peaked at number one on multiple Arabian charts, most significantly Hit Marker, where it remained atop for 15 consecutive weeks, becoming the longest-running topper in the chart history. Nancy 7 became Ajram's second album to earn the World Music Award as the World's best selling Middle Eastern act. The second children's album by Ajram, Super Nancy, was released in September 2012. It debuted atop the Best-Selling Albums Chart of Hit Marker and stayed atop for continuous weeks. Two years later, Ajram released her eighth album, Nancy 8 (2014). It entered Hit Marker chart directly to number one and remained atop for continuous weeks. The album also was 2014's highest debut for a female album in the Middle East, winning her third World Music Award. The album's lead single, "Ma Tegi Hena" became the fastest selling Arabic song on iTunes history, beating Ahmed Chawki's "Habibi I Love You" and topped Arabic Year End Chart of The Official Lebanese Top 20 as the most streamed song in Lebanon for 2014. Ajram's ninth album Nancy 9 followed in April 2017. It topped Hit Marker chart for 16 continuous weeks since its release. Her tenth album Nancy 10 was released in July 2021.

On 25 July 2022, Ajram's single 'Sah Sah' became the first Arabic language song to enter Billboard's Dance/Electronic chart.

Albums

Studio albums

Live albums

Compilation albums

Reissues

Singles

Album singles

Non-album singles

Occasionals

Soundtracks

Commercials

Coca-Cola slogans 

Coca-Cola Middle East have always incorporated International Coke slogans into pan-Arab campaigns with Ajram. In 2007, Coca-Cola released their international trademark campaign of their popular slogan "The Coke Side of Life", which focused on themes such as fun, happiness, colors, and life. A collaboration with Nancy Ajram lead to the making of the song "El Dounya Helwa" (Life Is Beautiful) for which a commercial was filmed with an American director on international standards and hi-tech effects. Ajram insisted on filming in Lebanon which had been hit by war a while back. "El Dounya Helwa" is considered Coca-Cola Middle East's and Ajram's most successful commercial to date; the single became one of Ajram's most successful songs, leading to its release as a single track in a live album entitled El Dounya Helwa – Live. In 2009, as the campaign was sequeled internationally with "Open Happiness", Coke Middle East and Nancy released "Eftah Albak Tefrah". However, due to Nancy's pregnancy and giving birth, she was unable to participate in the print or TV campaigns that year and the song was used on the International commercial instead. A website was launched for that campaign entitled "Eftah Tefrah". Under the slogan "Doses of Happiness", "Farha Ala Farha" was released for 2012 Ramadan TV ad campaign. In 2010, Coca-Cola released an Arabic version of Wavin' Flag originally by K'naan. The Arabic version "Shaggaa Bi Alamak" has Ajram featuring K'naan and meant for pan-Arab promotion of 2010 FIFA World Cup to be held in South Africa. In 2014, Ajram recorded for Coca-Cola "Shaggaa Helmak" featuring Cheb Khaled for the 2014 FIFA World Cup as well.

Other jingles

Notes

References

External links
 Official website
 
 
 

Ajram, Nancy
Pop music discographies